Michael Joyce Reginald "Mick" Woods (1857 - 12 November 1934) was a member of the Queensland Legislative Assembly.

Biography
Woods was born in Parramatta, New South Wales, the son of the Michael Woods and his wife Sarah (née McCreah). He was educated in Goulburn and he spent all his working life in the railways.

On 12 August 1879 he married Bridget Pickering at Dalby and together had three sons. Bridget died in 1884 and four years later, on 23 July 1888, Woods married Deborah Ann Gilbert (died 1902) and together had three sons and three daughters. He died in Brisbane in November 1934 and his funeral proceeded from his daughter's residence in Bulimba to the Balmoral Cemetery.

Public life
Woods started out in Queensland state politics as a member of the Labour Party, but in 1907 he switched to the Kidstonites for six months, then the Opposition Party for three months before rejoining the Kidstonites in February 1908. For his last year in parliament he sat as an independent Opposition member.

In 1902 he won the seat of Woothakata. He held the seat until he was defeated by future Queensland Premier, Ted Theodore in 1909.

References

Members of the Queensland Legislative Assembly
1857 births
1934 deaths
Australian Labor Party members of the Parliament of Queensland